RRI 1 is a Romanian language news radio station.

External links
 RRI.ro

Radio stations in Romania
Romanian-language radio stations
Romanian Radio Broadcasting Company